Peter Gordon Atkinson is the current dean of Worcester. He was born on 26 August 1952  and educated at St John's College, Oxford. Ordained in 1980, his first post was a curacy in Clapham after which he was priest-in-charge of St Mary, Tatsfield. He was then rector of Holy Trinity, Bath, last principal of Chichester Theological College, and rector of Lavant. After this he was a canon residentiary at Chichester Cathedral before his current appointment. On 18 November 2014 he was awarded an Honorary Doctorate of Letters by the University of Worcester.

References

1952 births
Alumni of St John's College, Oxford
Deans of Worcester
Living people
Principals of Chichester Theological College